Ceinos de Campos is a municipality located in the province of Valladolid, Castile and León, Spain.

According to the 2004 census (INE), the municipality had a population of 278 inhabitants.

See also
Templar church of Saint Mary (Ceinos de Campos), demolished.

References

Municipalities in the Province of Valladolid
Enclaves and exclaves